The 1929–30 season was the 33rd in the history of the Western Football League.

The Division One champions for the third time were Yeovil and Petters United, after finishing bottom of the table the previous season. The previous season's champions, Bristol Rovers Reserves, finished bottom this year. The winners of Division Two were Trowbridge Town for the second time in three years. There was again no promotion or relegation between the two divisions this season.

Division One
The composition of the eight-club Division One remained the same as for the previous season, with no clubs joining or leaving.

Division Two
Division Two was increased from nine to ten clubs after Salisbury City and Yeovil and Petters United Reserves left the league, and three new clubs joined:

Bristol City "A"
Paulton Rovers, rejoining after leaving the league in 1926.
Wells City, rejoining after leaving the league following the inaugural season in 1893.

References

1929-30
4